Kevin Serge Pamphile (born November 27, 1990) is a former American football offensive tackle. He played college football at Purdue and was drafted by the Tampa Bay Buccaneers in the fifth round of the 2014 NFL Draft. He has also played for the Tennessee Titans.

Early years
Pamphile was born in Haiti and moved to the United States.

High school and college
Pamphile attended William H. Turner Technical Arts High School and played basketball there. He did not play football until his senior year, but he received football recruiting offers from Purdue University, Middle Tennessee State University and Florida Atlantic University. As a senior football player, he earned All-Dade County honors and played in the Nike South Florida All-Star Game.

He committed to play football at Purdue. He spent the 2009 season at Purdue as a redshirt, then played a season as a defensive lineman. He moved to the offensive line before his sophomore year. He became Purdue's starting left tackle in 2013.

Professional career
Prior to the 2014 NFL Draft, Pamphile was projected to be a 6th round draft pick by NFLDraftScout.com. He was rated as the 17th-best offensive tackle in the draft. Sportswriter Aaron Wilson wrote that ten teams had expressed interest in Pamphile, including the Oakland Raiders, New York Giants, Green Bay Packers, Houston Texans and Jacksonville Jaguars.

Pamphile was drafted by the Tampa Bay Buccaneers with the 149th pick of the 2014 NFL Draft. The team signed him to a four-year contract. He made his NFL debut on November 2, 2014.

On March 22, 2018, Pamphile signed a one-year contract with the Tennessee Titans. He played in the first three games of the 2018 season, starting two at tackle before being placed on injured reserve on September 25, 2018. On March 13, 2019, Pamphile signed a one-year contract extension with the Titans.

He signed with the Washington Football Team on July 28, 2020. He was released on August 20, 2020.

References

External links
Washington Football Team bio
Purdue Boilermakers bio

1990 births
Living people
American football offensive tackles
Haitian emigrants to the United States
Haitian players of American football
Players of American football from Miami
Purdue Boilermakers football players
Miami Central Senior High School alumni
Tampa Bay Buccaneers players
Tennessee Titans players
Washington Football Team players
Ed Block Courage Award recipients